Carlo Pedini (born 19 June 1956) is an Italian classical composer.

Life 
Born in Perugia, Pedini taught himself music from the age of 13, before studying with Fernando Sulpizi at the Perugia Conservatory, Franco Donatoni in Siena and Salvatore Sciarrino in Città di Castello. He now teaches at the Perugia Conservatory, having previously taught in Avellino, Adria and Pesaro.
Since 1980 Pedini has won prizes in numerous competitions. In 1995 his orchestral piece Il Cantico dei Cantici ("The Song of Solomon") won a prize at the "2 August" competition in Bologna. In September 1990 the RAI National Symphony Orchestra conducted by Vittorio Parisi took part in the 42nd Prix Italia in Palermo, playing Pedini's Predica agli Uccelli ("Sermon to the Birds") for soprano, piano, synthesised voice, tape and orchestra on a text by Lucio Lironi and Claudio Novelli. In 1993 the RAI commissioned his dramatic oratorio Il Mistero Jacopone (the story of Jacopone da Todi, the greatest Italian poet before Dante) for four voices, baritone, medieval instruments, chorus and orchestra, performed by the RAI National Symphony Orchestra conducted by Karl Martin, with the voice of Jacopone Mario Scaccia.
In 2004 the Arena di Verona Foundation commissioned and performed the ballet L'anima del Perugino ("The Soul of Perugino"). In 2005 his "Requiem" for choir, organ and strings was performed at the Kusatsu Summer Festival in Japan. In 2007 his Magnificat (grande) for children's choir and instruments was performed at La Scala in Milan.
From 1996-2003 Pedini was artistic director of Sagra Musicale Umbra, one of the oldest festivals in Europe. Works he commissioned or whose world premieres he organized include: Songs of Milarepa by Philip Glass (1997), Grido ("Shout") by Ennio Morricone (1998) and Concerto-cantata de Perugia by Leo Brouwer (1999). In 2004-2005 he was composer in residence for the Sagra Musicale Umbra festival. 
His compositions are performed and broadcast in Italy, France, Germany, Sweden, Greece, Russia, U.S.A, Japan and other countries. They are published by Casa Musicale Sonzogno, Milano. He is also known as a painter
In 2016 he had the Premiere of "Agnus tropato"  for three chorus in The United Kingdom with James Morgan Conductor and the BBC Singers
From 2011 to 2016 he was president of the "Guido D'Arezzo" foundation. He also has activities in the field of fine arts.

Music
Works for orchestra
Concerto for violin and orchestra (1981)
Il Cantico dei Cantici ("The Song of Solomon") (1986)
La Casa di Asterione (1989)
Euclide si diverte ("Euclid enjoys himself") (1991)
Adagio (da uno studio per Jacopone) (1991) for strings
Sinfonia (Reck-Symphony) (1993–1997)
L'Addio ("The farewell")
L'Attesa ("The wait")
Il Ritorno ("The return")
I colori del Perugino ("The Colours of Perugino") (1998) for flute, four clarinets and strings
Canzoni usa e getta ("Disposable Songs") (1998)
Canone di Pedini (1999) for strings
Canzonetta (2000)
Non svegliate Verdi ... ("Don't awaken Verdi") (2001)
Concertino a volo D'Angelo (2005) for piano, choir ad lib. and strings
Sei frammenti francescani (2006) for voice ad lib. and orchestra (texts drawn from The Life of St Francis (first and second) by Tommaso da Celano)
 La Follia (2009) for Strings
 Canova 2016 (2016) for Strings
 Le Stagioni non sono più le stesse (2017) for Violin and Strings
 H2O - Concerto per pianoforte e archi (2016) for piano and Strings

Works for soloists, choir and orchestra
Torneremo a camminare (1985), cantata for choir, strings and cembalo, text by Aldo Capitini
Il Mistero Jacopone (1989–1993) dramatic oratorio for four voices, baritone, medieval instruments, choir and orchestra, text by Claudio Novelli and Lucio Lironi
In Te Domine speravi ("In Thee Lord I Put My Trust") (1994–1995) for choir (or 4 solo voices), organ and chamber orchestra
Te Deum (1994–1999) for choir, children's voices, organ and orchestra
Carme millenario (1999) for choir, wind orchestra and 5 percussionists
Pater noster (2000) for tenor, choir and orchestra
Victimae paschali laudes (2000) for tenor, choir and orchestra
Requiem (2000–2003) for mixed choir, children's choir, organ and strings
Missa Liturgica (2004) for choir and strings (or solo organ)

Lyric operas and ballets
Rabarbaro, rabarbaro ("Rhubarb, rhubarb") (1982–83), opera in one act, text by Gino Viziano
Orfeo in città ("Orpheus in Town") (1996), chamber opera in one act, text by Alberto Pellegrino
Un giorno qualunque ("Some day or other") (1995–1998), opera in one act, text by Gino Viziano and Carlo Pedini
Così fan (quasi) tutte ("That's what [almost] all women do") (2001–2002), chamber-opera in one act, text by Giacomo Pedini
Il Pranzo ("The Lunch") (2002) ballet in one act for orchestra
Il Miracolo ("The Miracle") (2004) chamber opera in one act, text by Giacomo Pedini
L’anima del Perugino (2004), ballet scene for orchestra

Works for chorus (and organ or instruments)
Super flumina Babylonis ("By the Rivers of Babylon") (1988) for five-part mixed choir
Magnificat (1997), in two versions:
Magnificat (small), for seven-part female choir and bells
Magnificat (great), for seven-part female choir, bells, clarinet and string quartet
De Profundis (1999) for four-part mixed choir and four trombones
Missa brevis (De Angelis) (1999) for three-part mixed choir and organ
Veni creator spiritus (2000) for four-part mixed choir, organ and flute ad lib.
L’ironia bizzarra (2003) for six female voices and harp or piano
Ave Maris Stella (2003) for five-part mixed choir and organ
Missa Liturgica (2004) for three-part mixed choir and organ (or strings)
 Agnus tropato (2011), for 3 Choirs (4 mixed voices)
 San Francesco predica agli uccelli (2015), for four-part mixed choir and Vogelstimmen
 Regina pacis (2017), for four-part mixed choir and piano (or Strigs)
 Tu es Sacerdos (2017), for four-part mixed choir and piano (or Strigs)

Chamber music
La clessidra dai chicchi di grano ("The wheat-grain hourglass") (1983)
Il mattino della terza giornata ("The morning of the third day") (1983, texts by Beti Jordan)
Two lieder from Il mattino della terza giornata (1983, texts by Beti Jordan)
L'acciarino di Weber ("Weber's lock") (1983, for clarinet)
Gli occhi (chiari) del tempo ("The [clear] eyes of time") (1985, for clarinet and piano)
Una serata di esercitazioni campali delle termiti guerriere ("An evening of military exercises for the warrior termites") (1985–1996, for five percussionists)
Un'ipotesi di tango (1991–1995, for guitar)
Sonata for violin and piano (1995)
La nebbia di Hietzing ("Hietzing's fog") (1995) for clarinet and string quartet
Sonata da camera (1996) for violin and eight instruments (flute, clarinet, bassoon, two violins, viola, cello and double bass)
Due interludi per Orfeo ("Two interludes for Orpheus")(1997) for violin, clarinet and piano
Gino ed altri angeli ("Gino and other angels") (1997) for soprano, flute and piano
Le strade di Torquato (The streets of Torquato") (1998) for twelve percussionists
Buon Anniversario ("Happy birthday") (2001) for five winds and five strings
Vent’anni dopo ("Twenty years later") (2001) for clarinet
Canzoni profane ("Secular songs") (2003) for clarinet and string quartet

Discography
L'acciarino di Weber, Edipan-Rome, 1983
Gli occhi (chiari) del tempo, Edipan-Rome, 1985
Rabarbaro, rabarbaro, Edipan-Rome, 1987
Il Mistero Jacopone, Quadrivium-Perugia, 1992
Vent'anni dopo, Hyperprysm-Perugia, 2005
Victimae Paschali laudes and Pater noster, SMU-Italy, 2000
Requiem, Camerata-Tokyo, 2005

Partial discography

Album

1997 - Rabarbaro rabarbaro - Soloists and Choir of the Lyric Academy of Osimo, Orchestra Filarmonica Marchigiana; Daniele Gatti, Conductor(Edipan-PAN-PRC-S20-53-1LP)
1995 - Il Mistero Jacopone - Orchestra Sinfonica della RAI di Torino; Karl Martin, Conductor (Quadrivium-SCA056-1CD)
2009 - Angela da Foligno - Chor "M.Alboni"; Orchester "I Solisti di Perugia"; Marcello Marini, choir master; Carlo Pedini, conductor(Quadrivium-QUAD80005-2CD)
2010 - Te Deum / Cantico delle creature - Choir "Marietta Alboni"; Orchester "I Solisti di Perugia"; Marcello Marini, choir master; Carlo Pedini, conductor(Quadrivium-QUAD006-1CD)
2011 - Requiem - Kusatsu Festival Choir and Orchestra; Fumiaki Kuriyama, choir master; Jörg Ewald Dähler, conductor(Quadrivium-QUAD80008-1CD)
2011 - Vespro di Santa Veronica - Chior "M.Alboni"; Orchester "Collegium Tiberinum"; Marcello Marini, conductor(Quadrivium-QUAD00010-1CD)
2011 - Magnificat - Choirs  "Kamenes In Canto" and "Polifonica Pievese"; Orchester "Città di Arezzo"; Gabriella Rossi, choir master; Francesco Seri, conductor(Quadrivium-QUAD00011-1CD)
2018 - Messe, Inni, Mottetti, Madrigali spirituali - "UT - Insieme vocale consonante", Lorenzo Donati conductor; Alessandro Tricomi organ, Fabio Afrune piano(Quadrivium-QUAD00012-2CD)
2018 - Carlo Pedini: La musica sacra - BOX with 9 CDs with the entire production of sacred music. Different musicians.(Quadrivium-SCA056, QUAD0005, QUAD006, QUAD008, QUAD00010, QUAD00011, QUAD00012)

Compilation 

1986 - "L'acciarino di Weber" in: MUSICISTI CONTEMPORANEI - Ciro Scarponi, clarinet (Edipan-PAN-PRC-S20-31-1LP)
1987 - "Gli occhi (chiari) del tempo" in: MUSICISTI CONTEMPORANEI - Ciro Scarponi, clarinet; Stefano Ragni, piano (Edipan-PAN-PRC-S20-45-1LP)
2005 - "Vent'anni dopo" in: "IL CLARINETTO DI CIRO SCARPONI" - Ciro Scarponi, clarinet (Hyperprism-LM109-1CD)
2005 - "Requiem" in: "The 26th KUSATSU INTERNATIONAL SUMMER FESTIVAL" - Kusatsu Festival Choir and Orchestra; Fumiaki Kuriyama, Chorleiter; Jörg Ewald Dähler, Dirigent (Camerata-Tokyo-CDT1067-1CD)
2008 - "Absolve Domine" in: REQUIEM - Fratelli Mancuso,voci e strumenti; Coro "Armoniosoincanto"; Menna String Quartet, Carlo Pedini, Franco Radicchia, Dirigent (Amiata Records-ARNR0308-1CD)
2009 - "La Follia" in: I REPERTORI DELLA FONOTECA "ORESTE TROTTA" VOL.2 - Orchester "I Solisti di Perugia"; Carlo Pedini, Dirigent (LaMaggiore-LM121-1CD)
2018 - "Le Stagioni non sono più le stesse" - Concerto per violino e orchestra d'archi (2017) - KLK Symphony Orchestra, Marko Komonko Geige, Ferdinando Nazzaro Dirigent . (Quadrivium-Egea-records - QUAD00013-1CD)
2019 - "La Follia" für Streicher (2009) - KLK String Orchestra, Ferdinando Nazzaro direttore. (Brilliant Classics 95822-1CD)

Literature 

Of eclectic interests, he public in 2012 with the Roman publishing house Cavallo di Ferro her debut novel,  The sixth season , selected among the finalists at the LXVI edition of the Premio Strega. Based on the structure of the Thomas Mann's novel Buddenbrooks of which replicates the structure with other original contents,  The sixth season  is a sort of "experiment of composition" in which the author wanted to apply the rules of musical composition to the creation of a literary text.

References

External links

 Casa Musicale Sonzogno, Carlo Pedini: Biography
 Carlo Pedini official web site
 Strega Prize official web site: Carlo Pedini, La Sesta Stagione
 

1956 births
Italian classical composers
Italian male classical composers
Living people
People from Perugia